Saxon is the given name of:

Saxon Gregory-Hunt (born 1993), New Zealander competitive weightlifter
Saxon W. Holt (1871-1940), American politician
Saxon Huxley (born 1988), British professional wrestler
Saxon Jenkins (1907-1989), Welsh landscape painter
Saxon Judd (1919–1990), American football player
Saxon McEwan, Scottish rugby football player
Saxon Rice (born 1976), Australian politician
Saxon Sharbino (born 1999), American actress
Saxon Sydney-Turner (1880-1962), member of the Bloomsbury Group 
Saxon White (born 1934), American medical researcher and academic and former rugby union player

Unisex given names